Orjinta is a surname. Notable people with the surname include:

Aloysius Orjinta, Nigerian Roman Catholic priest and senior lecturer
Romanus Orjinta (1981–2014), Nigerian football player 

Surnames of Nigerian origin